Alistair Quinn (born 1 June 1993) is an Australian footballer who plays as a left or right full back for Olympic FC.

External links

 brisbanestrikers profile

References

1993 births
Living people
Association football defenders
Australian soccer players
Brisbane Strikers FC players
SC Telstar players
NAC Breda players
Western Sydney Wanderers FC players
Brisbane Roar FC players